Millboro is an unincorporated community in Bath County, Virginia, in the United States.

Douthat State Park Historic District and Millboro School are listed on the National Register of Historic Places.

References

Unincorporated communities in Bath County, Virginia
Unincorporated communities in Virginia